Villegailhenc is a commune in the Aude department in southern France.

In mid-October 2018, Villegailhenc, Conques-sur-Orbiel, and Villardonnel, and Trèbes, along with nearby areas along the river Aude, were devastated when the river flooded after intense rain. 12 people were killed, including a nun.

Population

See also
Communes of the Aude department

References

Communes of Aude